Prince William Hyacinth of Nassau-Siegen (3 April 1667 in Brussels – 18 February 1743 in Hadamar) was a Prince of Nassau-Siegen.  He also claimed the Principality of Orange.

Early life 

William Hyacinth was born as the eldest surviving son of Prince John Francis Desideratus of Nassau-Siegen and his second wife, Eleonore Sophie of Baden-Baden (d. 1668).

Biography 
In 1695, he took up his residence in Siegen. In the same year, the city fell victim to a great fire, which burned 350 buildings, two churches and the Nassau Court, the headquarters of the ruling family. His father began building a new castle in Siegen as the new family home in 1696.

From 17 December 1699 to 2 March 1707, William Hyacinth was the ruler of Nassau-Siegen. He was hoping to inherit much more than his father's principality of Nassau-Siegen, since he was one of the nearest male relatives of the childless King William III of England, and thus a potential heir to William's extensive lands in Germany and the Dutch Republic. However, William III left his possessions by will to John William Friso of Nassau-Dietz.  William Hyacinth later used the title of Prince of Orange in Brabant.

He did not even inherit all of his father's wealth. His father had remarried with Isabella Clara du Puget de la Serre and had had seven surviving children with her. In his will, he left her a bequest of 1100 taler per year. Her two sons each received 500 taler per year and her five daughters 200 taler each. William Hyacinth challenged this will before the Imperial Supreme Court, however, he lost his case in 1702.

In the same year William III died in England. William Hyacinth traveled to Paris to secure the support of France with regard to his rights of inheritance. Other claimants were King Frederick I of Prussia and John William Friso of Nassau-Dietz, who was designated as the sole heir in William III's testament.

King Louis XIV, however, showed little interest in supporting a Protestant prince without military power base. William Hyacinth then travelled to the principality of Orange and announced there that he had seized the principality. Louis XIV declared that the Prince Henri Jules of Condé was the rightful heir to the principality of Orange and occupied it militarily.  Henri Jules transferred the principality to France. In the Treaty of Utrecht of 1713, the lands of the principality were definitively awarded to France.

His lavish court, with which he wanted to underscore his claim to the inheritance of Orange, his journeys and gifts cost far more than his income from the Duchy of Nassau-Siegen could bear. He increased taxes across the country to intolerable levels. Another source of income were excessive fines, which further damaged his reputation in his country.

His quick temper and ambition were feared in their own family. When his brother (and successor) Frederick William Adolf expressed his displeasure, William Hyacinth directed the guns of his castle on his brother's castle in order to demonstrate his power. Frederick William Adolf then sued his brother in the assembly of the Westphalian Circle.  When William Hyacinth visited the court in Vienna in 1705, to raise support for his inheritance claim, Siegen was occupied by troops from Nassau and Prussia. The people revolted and plundered and disarmed William Hyacinth's castle.

The number of complaints about his conduct continued to increase. On 15 July 1706, Siegen was again occupied, this time by troops from County Palatine of Neuburg and Prussia, at the request of the Aulic Council.  William Hyacinth's Chancellor, de Colomba, who had played a major rôle in William Hyacinth's tyranny, was arrested and on 20 December 1710 exiled from the German Empire for life. William Hyacinth himself fled to Hadamar, to his cousin Prince Francis Alexander.

The revolts against his reign of terror continued.  On 29 March 1707 William Hyacinth had Friedrich Flender von der Hardt, a suspected leader of the insurgents, beheaded without any form of trial. Emperor Joseph I used this occasion to deprive William Hyacinth of his principality.  It was temporarily administered by two imperial councillors and then passed to Frederick William Adolf. In 1713, France withdrew William Hyacinth's French title of Count of Chalon.

William Hyacinth was awarded an annual pension of 4000 talers. The remaining assets were used to pay the pensions of his stepmother and her siblings, his creditors and a debt of honor to the family of Friedrich Flender.  William Hyacinth complained to the emperor and to the Diet of Regensburg, however, neither complaint met with success.

Marriages and issue 
William Hyacinth was married three times: 

His first wife was Princess Maria Franziska of Fürstenberg-Heiligenberg (1660-1691), daughter of Herman Egon, Prince of Fürstenberg-Heiligenberg and his wife Countess Maria Franziska of Fürstenberg-Stühlingen (1638-1680). They were married on 9 April 1687 in Liège. She died on 7 June 1691. With her he had three children:
 Joseph Hyacinth (1688-1688)
 Francis Joseph (1689–1703)
 A daughter (1691–1692)

His second wife was Maria Anna of Hohenlohe-Waldenburg-Schillingsfürst (1678-1739), daughter of Count Ludwig Gustav of Hohenlohe-Waldenburg-Schillingsfürst (1634-1697) and his wife, Baroness Anna Barbara of Schönborn (1648-1721). They were married on 22 May 1698 in Frankfurt. With her he had one daughter:
 Anna Maria Josepha (1704–1723)

His third wife was Countess Sophia Theresia Hedwigis Eva of Starhemberg (1722-1773), daughter of Imperial envoy, Count Konrad Sigismund of Starhemberg (1689–1727) and his wife, Princess Leopoldine of Löwenstein-Wertheim-Rochefort (1689-1763). She was elder sister of Georg Adam, Prince of Starhemberg. William and Sophia were married on 28 July 1740 in Vienna. This marriage was childless. After Williams death, Sophia married her first cousin, Constantine, Landgrave of Hesse-Rotenburg and had further issue.

Ancestors

Footnotes

References 
 Christian Brachthäuser: Le Prince Regent d'Orange - Wilhelm Hyazinth Fürst zu Oranien und Nassau-Siegen (1667-1743), 2010, 
Alessandro Cont, La Chiesa dei principi. Le relazioni tra Reichskirche, dinastie sovrane tedesche e stati italiani (1688-1763), preface of Elisabeth Garms-Cornides, Trento, Provincia autonoma di Trento, 2018, pp. 149-152, https://www.academia.edu/38170694/La_Chiesa_dei_principi._Le_relazioni_tra_Reichskirche_dinastie_sovrane_tedesche_e_stati_italiani_1688-1763_prefazione_di_Elisabeth_Garms-Cornides_Trento_Provincia_autonoma_di_Trento_2018
 E. F. Keller: Wilhelm Hyacinth von Nassau-Siegen, in: Annalen des Vereins für Nassauische Altertumskunde und Geschichtsforschung, vol 9, p. 49 ff, Online

External links 
 William Hyacinth in the Orange image catalogue

Princes of Nassau
1666 births
1743 deaths
17th-century German people
18th-century German people